Eugnosta busckana is a species of moth of the family Tortricidae. It is found in California.

The wingspan is about 24 mm. Adults have been recorded on wing from November to February.

References

Moths described in 1939
Eugnosta